West Texas Boys Ranch (WTBR) is a Christian private residential community for boys located in Tankersley, unincorporated Tom Green County, Texas, near San Angelo. The  facility is a 501(c)3 nonprofit organization, and it is open to any qualified boy, regardless of his or his family's ability to pay the tuition. The ranch uses donations to fund its services. The ranch can accommodate up to 40 boys, who come from across the United States. The ranch does not take custody of its boys, and it is not a boot camp, detention center, drug rehabilitation center, or a "last resort" for hardcore juvenile offenders.

History
The ranch has provided a community for boys since 1947.  In 2003 a FedEx Cessna Caravan crashed on a plot of land belonging to the ranch.

Operations
The facility consists of  5 residential cottages, each with max capacity of 8 boys. Each boy is assigned to a particular cottage, which is overseen by a husband and wife team. If a team has children, those children are also a part of the cottage household. Every boy participates in chores, such as cleaning his room, cleaning his shared bathroom, and cleaning his laundry. Several chores, such as mopping the kitchen, vacuuming the living room, and taking out the trash, are rotated among the boys. Each boy has a rank, depending on his behavior. The lowest rank with the fewest privileges is the Tumbleweed, while the highest rank, Wrangler, has the most privileges.There was also a former rank of Top hand even higher than Wrangler, but due to issues with boys who misused the level, it was removed from the system. Each level shows the depth to which each boy is trying to work the program, and the higher the level the more responsibility each boy has. Each boy can see his progress on a chart so he knows what he needs to do to attain a certain rank. Each resident works with livestock, such as Longhorn cattle, show pigs, and horses. During the summer boys work in ranching jobs.

Composition
The cottages are Brown Cottage, Doss Cottage, Minear Cottage, and Stevens Cottage. Minear, named after Roy and Evelyn Minear, was built in 1983. Brown, funded by a donation from Wilbur Carr Brown of San Angelo, Texas, was built in 1984. Doss, funded by a donation from the M.S. Doss Foundation in Seminole, Texas, was built in 1985. Stevens, funded by a donation from Perry and Ruby Stevens of Fredericksburg, Texas, was built in 1985.

Education
Every boy in the home is enrolled in  Central High School or Lonestar Middle School in San Angelo. If a boy has an issue at school, the school staff will notify the West Texas Boys Ranch staff. Irion County High School and San Angelo Texas Leadership Charter Academy are schools boys formerly attended.

References

External links

 West Texas Boys Ranch

Buildings and structures in Tom Green County, Texas
1947 establishments in Texas